The Serbs are the most numerous South Slavic ethnic group native to the Balkans in Southeastern Europe, who share a common Serbian ancestry, culture, history, and language.

The majority of Serbs live in their nation state of Serbia, as well as in Bosnia and Herzegovina, Croatia, Montenegro, North Macedonia, and Kosovo. They also form significant minorities in Slovenia. There is a large Serb diaspora in Western Europe, and outside Europe and there are significant communities in North America and Australia.

The Serbs share many cultural traits with the rest of the peoples of Southeast Europe. They are predominantly Eastern Orthodox Christians by religion. The Serbian language (a standardized version of Serbo-Croatian) is official in Serbia, co-official in Kosovo and Bosnia and Herzegovina, and is spoken by the plurality in Montenegro.

Ethnology

The identity of Serbs is rooted in Eastern Orthodoxy and traditions. In the 19th century, the Serbian national identity was manifested, with awareness of history and tradition, medieval heritage, cultural unity, despite living under different empires. Three elements, together with the legacy of the Nemanjić dynasty, were crucial in forging identity and preservation during foreign domination: the Serbian Orthodox Church, the Serbian language, and the Kosovo Myth. When the Principality of Serbia gained independence from the Ottoman Empire, Orthodoxy became crucial in defining the national identity, instead of language which was shared by other South Slavs (Croats and Bosniaks). The tradition of slava, the family saint feast day, is an important ethnic marker of Serb identity, and is usually regarded their most significant and most solemn feast day.

The origin of the ethnonym is unclear. The most prominent theory considers it of Proto-Slavic origin.  argued native Slavic provenance of the ethnonym, claiming that the theory advances a conclusion that the ethnonym has a meaning of a family kinship or alliance, which was also argued by a number of other scholars.

Genetic origins

	
According to a triple analysis – autosomal, mitochondrial and paternal — of available data from large-scale studies on Balto-Slavs and their proximal populations, the whole genome SNP data situates Serbs with Montenegrins in between two Balkan clusters. Y-DNA results show that haplogroups I2a and R1a together stand for the majority of the makeup, with more than 53 percent. The aforementioned Serbian Y-chromosomes belong to lineages believed to be pre-Neolithic. Such significant levels are possibly the result of Neolithic migrations encroaching on Paleolithic populations against the Adriatic Sea.

History

Arrival of the Slavs

Early Slavs, especially Sclaveni and Antae, including the White Serbs, invaded and settled Southeastern Europe in the 6th and 7th century. Up until the late 560s their activity was raiding, crossing from the Danube, though with limited Slavic settlement mainly through Byzantine foederati colonies. The Danube and Sava frontier was overwhelmed by large-scale Slavic settlement in the late 6th and early 7th century. What is today central Serbia was an important geo-strategical province, through which the Via Militaris crossed. This area was frequently intruded by barbarians in the 5th and 6th centuries. The numerous Slavs mixed with and assimilated the descendants of the indigenous population (Illyrians, Thracians, Dacians, Romans, Celts). White Serbs from White Serbia came to an area near Thessaloniki and then they settled area between Dinaric Alps and Adriatic coast. The region of "Rascia" (Raška) was the center of Serb settlement and Serb tribes also occupied parts of modern-day Herzegovina and Montenegro. Prior to their arrival to the Balkans, Serbs were predominantly involved in agriculture, which is why they settled in areas which were cultivated even during Roman times.

Middle Ages

The first Serb states, Raška and Duklja (825–1120), were formed chiefly under the Vlastimirović and Vojislavljević dynasties respectively. The other Serb-inhabited lands, or principalities, that were mentioned included the "countries" of Paganija, Zahumlje, Travunija. With the decline of the Serbian state of Duklja in the late 11th century, Raška separated from it and replaced it as the most powerful Serbian state. Prince Stefan Nemanja (r. 1169–96) conquered the neighbouring territories of Kosovo, Duklja and Zachlumia. The Nemanjić dynasty ruled over Serbia until the 14th century. Nemanja's older son, Stefan Nemanjić, became Serbia's first recognized king, while his younger son, Rastko, founded the Serbian Orthodox Church in the year 1219, and became known as Saint Sava after his death. Parts of modern-day Montenegro, Bosnia and Herzegovina, and central Serbia would come under the control of Nemanjić.

Over the next 140 years, Serbia expanded its borders, from numerous smaller principalities, reaching to a unified Serbian Empire. Its cultural model remained Byzantine, despite political ambitions directed against the empire. The medieval power and influence of Serbia culminated in the reign of Stefan Dušan, who ruled the state from 1331 until his death in 1355. Ruling as Emperor from 1346, his territory included Macedonia, northern Greece, Montenegro, and almost all of modern Albania. When Dušan died, his son Stephen Uroš V became Emperor.

With Turkish invaders beginning their conquest of the Balkans in the 1350s, a major conflict ensued between them and the Serbs, the first major battle was the Battle of Maritsa (1371), in which the Serbs were defeated. With the death of two important Serb leaders in the battle, and with the death of Stephen Uroš that same year, the Serbian Empire broke up into several small Serbian domains. These states were ruled by feudal lords, with Zeta controlled by the Balšić family, Raška, Kosovo and northern Macedonia held by the Branković family and Lazar Hrebeljanović holding today's Central Serbia and a portion of Kosovo. Hrebeljanović was subsequently accepted as the titular leader of the Serbs because he was married to a member of the Nemanjić dynasty. In 1389, the Serbs faced the Ottomans at the Battle of Kosovo on the plain of Kosovo Polje, near the town of Priština. Both Lazar and Sultan Murad I were killed in the fighting. The battle most likely ended in a stalemate, and afterwards Serbia enjoyed a short period of prosperity under despot Stefan Lazarević and resisted falling to the Turks until 1459.

Early modern period

The Serbs had taken an active part in the wars fought in the Balkans against the Ottoman Empire, and also organized uprisings; because of this, they suffered persecution and their territories were devastated – major migrations from Serbia into Habsburg territory ensued. After allied Christian forces had captured Buda from the Ottoman Empire in 1686 during the Great Turkish War, Serbs from Pannonian Plain (present-day Hungary, Slavonia region in present-day Croatia, Bačka and Banat regions in present-day Serbia) joined the troops of the Habsburg monarchy as separate units known as Serbian Militia. Serbs, as volunteers, massively joined the Austrian side.

Many Serbs were recruited during the devshirme system,  a form of slavery in the Ottoman Empire, in which boys from Balkan Christian families were forcibly converted to Islam and trained for infantry units of the Ottoman army known as the Janissaries. A number of Serbs who converted to Islam occupied high-ranking positions within the Ottoman Empire, such as Grand Vizier Sokollu Mehmed Pasha and Minister of War field marshal Omar Pasha Latas.

In 1688, the Habsburg army took Belgrade and entered the territory of present-day Central Serbia. Louis William, Margrave of Baden-Baden called Serbian Patriarch Arsenije III Čarnojević to raise arms against the Turks; the Patriarch accepted and returned to the liberated Peć. As Serbia fell under Habsburg control, Leopold I granted Arsenije nobility and the title of duke. In early November, Arsenije III met with Habsburg commander-in-chief, General Enea Silvio Piccolomini in Prizren; after this talk he sent a note to all Serb bishops to come to him and collaborate only with Habsburg forces.

A Great Migration of the Serbs (1690) to Habsburg lands was undertaken by Patriarch Arsenije III. The large community of Serbs concentrated in Banat, southern Hungary and the Military Frontier included merchants and craftsmen in the cities, but mainly refugees that were peasants. Smaller groups of Serbs also migrated to the Russian Empire, where they occupied high positions in the military circles.

The Serbian Revolution for independence from the Ottoman Empire lasted eleven years, from 1804 until 1815. The revolution comprised two separate uprisings which gained autonomy from the Ottoman Empire that eventually evolved towards full independence (1835–1867). During the First Serbian Uprising, led by Duke Karađorđe Petrović, Serbia was independent for almost a decade before the Ottoman army was able to reoccupy the country. Shortly after this, the Second Serbian Uprising began. Led by Miloš Obrenović, it ended in 1815 with a compromise between Serbian revolutionaries and Ottoman authorities. Likewise, Serbia was one of the first nations in the Balkans to abolish feudalism. Serbs are among the first ethnic groups in Europe to form a nation and a clear sense of national identity.

Modern period

In the early 1830s, Serbia gained autonomy and its borders were recognized, with Miloš Obrenović being recognized as its ruler. Serbia is the fourth modern-day European country, after France, Austria and the Netherlands, to have a codified legal system, as of 1844. The last Ottoman troops withdrew from Serbia in 1867, although Serbia's and Montenegro's independence was not recognized internationally until the Congress of Berlin in 1878.

Serbia fought in the Balkan Wars of 1912–13, which forced the Ottomans out of the Balkans and doubled the territory and population of the Kingdom of Serbia. In 1914, a young Bosnian Serb student named Gavrilo Princip assassinated Archduke Franz Ferdinand of Austria, which directly contributed to the outbreak of World War I. In the fighting that ensued, Serbia was invaded by Austria-Hungary. Despite being outnumbered, the Serbs defeated the Austro-Hungarians at the Battle of Cer, which marked the first Allied victory over the Central Powers in the war. Further victories at the battles of Kolubara and the Drina meant that Serbia remained unconquered as the war entered its second year. However, an invasion by the forces of Germany, Austria-Hungary and Bulgaria overwhelmed the Serbs in the winter of 1915, and a subsequent withdrawal by the Serbian Army through Albania took the lives of more than 240,000 Serbs. Serb forces spent the remaining years of the war fighting on the Salonika front in Greece, before liberating Serbia from Austro-Hungarian occupation in November 1918. Serbia suffered the biggest casualty rate in World War I.

Following the victory in WWI Serbs subsequently formed the Kingdom of Serbs, Croats and Slovenes with other South Slavic peoples. The country was later renamed the Kingdom of Yugoslavia, and was led from 1921 to 1934 by King Alexander I of the Serbian Karađorđević dynasty. During World War II, Yugoslavia was invaded by the Axis powers in April 1941. The country was subsequently divided into many pieces, with Serbia being directly occupied by the Germans. Serbs in the Independent State of Croatia (NDH) were targeted for extermination as part of genocide by the Croatian ultra-nationalist, fascist Ustaše. The Ustaše view of national and racial identity, as well as the theory of Serbs as an inferior race, was under the influence of Croatian nationalists and intellectuals from the end of the 19th and the beginning of the 20th century. Jasenovac camp was notorious for the barbaric practices which occurred in it. Sisak and Jastrebarsko concentration camp were specially formed for children. Serbs in the NDH suffered among the highest casualty rates in Europe during the World War II, while the NDH was one of the most lethal regimes in the 20th century. Diana Budisavljević, a humanitarian of Austrian descent, carried out rescue operations from Ustaše camps and saved more than 15,000 children, mostly Serbs.

More than half a million Serbs were killed in the territory of Yugoslavia during World War II. Serbs in occupied Yugoslavia subsequently formed a resistance movement known as the Yugoslav Army in the Homeland, or the Chetniks. The Chetniks had the official support of the Allies until 1943, when Allied support shifted to the Communist Yugoslav Partisans, a multi-ethnic force, formed in 1941, which also had a large majority of Serbs in its ranks in the first two years of war. Over the entirety of the war, the ethnic composition of the Partisans was 53 percent Serb. During the entire course of the WWII in Yugoslavia, 64.1% of all Bosnian Partisans were Serbs. Later, after the fall of Italy in September 1943, other ethnic groups joined Partisans in larger numbers.

At the end of the war, the Partisans, led by Josip Broz Tito, emerged victorious. Yugoslavia subsequently became a Communist state. Tito died in 1980, and his death saw Yugoslavia plunge into economic turmoil. Yugoslavia disintegrated in the early 1990s, and a series of wars resulted in the creation of five new states. The heaviest fighting occurred in Croatia, Bosnia and Herzegovina, whose Serb populations rebelled and declared independence. The war in Croatia ended in August 1995, with a Croatian military offensive known as Operation Storm put a stop to the Croatian Serb rebellion and causing as many as 200,000 Serbs to flee the country. The Bosnian War ended that same year, with the Dayton Agreement dividing the country along ethnic lines. In 1998–99, a conflict in Kosovo between the Yugoslav Army and Albanians seeking independence erupted into full-out war, resulting in a 78-day-long NATO bombing campaign which effectively drove Yugoslav security forces from Kosovo. Subsequently, more than 200,000 Serbs and other non-Albanians fled the province. On 5 October 2000, Yugoslav President Slobodan Milosević was overthrown in a bloodless revolt after he refused to admit defeat in the 2000 Yugoslav general election.

Demographics

Modern demographic distribution of ethnic Serbs throughout homeland and native regions, as well as in Serbian ethnic diaspora, represents an outcome of several historical and demographic processes, shaped both by economic migrations and forced displacements during the recent Yugoslav Wars (1991–1999).

Balkans 
There are nearly 8 million Serbs living in their native homelands, within the geographical borders of former Yugoslavia. In Serbia itself, around 6 million people identify themselves as ethnic Serbs, and constitute about 83% of the population. More than a million live in Bosnia and Herzegovina (predominantly in the Republika Srpska), where they are one of the three constituent ethnic groups. Serbs in Croatia, Montenegro and North Macedonia also have recognized collective rights, and number some 186,000, 178,000 and 39,000 people, respectively, while another estimated 96,000 live in the disputed area of Kosovo. Smaller minorities exist in Slovenia, some 36,000 people, respectively.

Outside of the former Yugoslavia, but within their historical and migratory areal, Serbs are officially recognized as national minority in Albania, Romania (18,000), Hungary (7,000), as well as in the Czech Republic and Slovakia.

Diaspora

There are over 2 million Serbs in diaspora throughout the world; some sources put that figure as high as 4 million. There is a large diaspora in Western Europe, particularly in Germany, Austria, Switzerland, France, Italy, Sweden and United Kingdom. Outside Europe, there are significant Serb communities in the United States, Canada, Australia, South America and Southern Africa. The existence of a large diaspora is mainly a consequence of either economic or political (coercion or expulsions) reasons. There were several waves of Serb emigration:

 The first wave took place since the end of the 19th century and lasted until World War II and was caused by economic reasons; particularly large numbers of Serbs (mainly from peripheral ethnic areas such as Herzegovina, Montenegro, Dalmatia, and Lika) emigrated to the United States.
 The second wave took place after the end of World War II. At this time, members of royalist Chetniks and other political opponents of communist regime fled the country mainly going overseas (United States and Australia) and, to a lesser degree, United Kingdom.
 The third wave, by far the largest, consisted of economic emigration beginning in the 1960s when several Western European countries signed bilateral agreements with Yugoslavia, allowing the recruitment of industrial workers to those countries; this lasted until the end of the 1980s. The major  destinations for migrants were West Germany, Austria, and Switzerland, and to a lesser extent France and Sweden. That generation of diaspora is collectively known as gastarbajteri, after German gastarbeiter ("guest-worker"), since most of the emigrants headed for German-speaking countries. These migrations left some parts of Serbia sparsely populated.
 Later emigration took place during the 1990s, and was caused by both political and economic reasons. The Yugoslav wars caused many Serbs from Croatia and Bosnia and Herzegovina to leave their countries in the first half of the 1990s. The economic sanctions imposed on Serbia caused an economic collapse with an estimated 300,000 people leaving Serbia during that period, 20% of which had a higher education.

Language

Serbs speak Serbian, a member of the South Slavic group of languages, specifically the Southwestern group. Standard Serbian is a standardized variety of Serbo-Croatian, and therefore mutually intelligible with Standard Croatian, Standard Montenegrin, and Standard Bosnian (see Differences in standard Serbian, Croatian and Bosnian), which are all based on the Shtokavian dialect.

 
Serbian is an official language in Serbia and Bosnia-Herzegovina and is a recognized minority language in Montenegro (although spoken by a plurality of population), Croatia, North Macedonia, Romania, Hungary, Czech Republic and Slovakia. Older forms of literary Serbian are Church Slavonic of the Serbian recension, which is still used for ecclesiastical purposes, and Slavonic-Serbian—a mixture of Serbian, Church Slavonic and Russian used from the mid-18th century to the first decades of the 19th century.

Serbian has active digraphia, using both Cyrillic and Latin alphabets. Serbian Cyrillic was devised in 1814 by Serbian linguist Vuk Karadžić, who created the alphabet on phonemic principles. Serbian Latin was created by Ljudevit Gaj and published in 1830. His alphabet mapped completely on Serbian Cyrillic which had been standardized by Vuk Karadžić a few years before.

Loanwords in the Serbian language besides common internationalisms are mostly from Greek, German and Italian, while words of Hungarian origin are present mostly in the north. There are some Turkish loanwords used (but mostly in rural areas) and they are mostly related to food. A considerable number of those words are actually Persian in origin but entered Serbian through Ottomans and are therefore considered Turkisms. There is considerable usage of French words as well, especially in military related terms. One Serbian word that is used in many of the world's languages is "vampire" (vampir).

Culture

Literature, icon painting, music, dance and medieval architecture are the artistic forms for which Serbia is best known. Traditional Serbian visual art (specifically frescoes, and to some extent icons), as well as ecclesiastical architecture, are highly reflective of Byzantine traditions, with some Mediterranean and Western influence.

Many Serbian monuments and works of art have been lost forever due to various wars and peacetime marginalizations.

In modern times (since the 19th century) Serbs also have a noteworthy classical music and works of philosophy.  Notable philosophers include Svetozar Marković, Branislav Petronijević, Ksenija Atanasijević, Radomir Konstantinović, Nikola Milošević, Mihailo Marković, Justin Popović and Mihailo Đurić.

Art, music, theatre, and cinema 

During the 12th and 13th centuries, many icons, wall paintings and manuscript miniatures came into existence, as many Serbian Orthodox monasteries and churches such as Hilandar, Žiča, Studenica, Sopoćani, Mileševa, Gračanica and Visoki Dečani were built. The architecture of some of these monasteries is world-famous. Prominent architectural styles in the Middle Ages were Raška architectural school, Morava architectural school and Serbo-Byzantin architectural style. During the same period UNESCO protected Stećak monumental medieval tombstones were built. The Independence of Serbia in the 19th century was soon followed with Serbo-Byzantine Revival in architecture.

Baroque and rococo trends in Serbian art emerged in the 18th century and are mostly represented in icon painting and portraits. Most of the Baroque authors were from the territory of Austrian Empire, such as Nikola Nešković, Teodor Kračun, Teodor Ilić Češljar, Zaharije Orfelin and Jakov Orfelin. Serbian painting showed the influence of Biedermeier and Neoclassicism as seen in works by Konstantin Danil and Pavel Đurković. Many painters followed the artistic trends set in the 19th century Romanticism, notably Đura Jakšić, Stevan Todorović, Katarina Ivanović and Novak Radonić. Since the mid-1800s, Serbia has produced a number of famous painters who are representative of general European artistic trends. One of the most prominent of these was Paja Jovanović, who painted massive canvases on historical themes such as the Migration of the Serbs (1896). Painter Uroš Predić was also prominent in the field of Serbian art, painting the Kosovo Maiden and Happy Brothers. While Jovanović and Predić were both realist painters, artist Nadežda Petrović was an impressionist and fauvist and Sava Šumanović was an accomplished Cubist. Painters Petar Lubarda, Vladimir Veličković and Ljubomir Popović were famous for their surrealism. Marina Abramović is a world-renowned performance artist, writer, and art filmmaker.

Traditional Serbian music includes various kinds of bagpipes, flutes, horns, trumpets, lutes, psalteries, drums and cymbals. The kolo is the traditional collective folk dance, which has a number of varieties throughout the regions. The first Serbian composers started working in the 14th and 15th century, like Kir Stefan the Serb. Composer and musicologist Stevan Stojanović Mokranjac is considered one of the most important founders of modern Serbian music. Other noted classical composers include Kornelije Stanković, Stanislav Binički, Petar Konjović, Miloje Milojević, Stevan Hristić, Josif Marinković, Luigi von Kunits, Ljubica Marić and Vasilije Mokranjac. Well-known musicians include Zdravko Čolić, Arsen Dedić, Predrag Gojković-Cune, Toma Zdravković, Milan Mladenović, Radomir Mihailović Točak, Bora Đorđević, Momčilo Bajagić Bajaga, Đorđe Balašević, Ceca and others.

Serbia has produced many talented filmmakers, the most famous of whom are Slavko Vorkapić, Dušan Makavejev, Živojin Pavlović, Slobodan Šijan, Goran Marković, Goran Paskaljević, Emir Kusturica, Želimir Žilnik, Srđan Dragojević, Srdan Golubović and Mila Turajlić. Žilnik and Stefan Arsenijević won the Golden Bear award at Berlinale, while Mila Turajlić won the main award at IDFA. Kusturica became world-renowned after winning the Palme d'Or twice at the Cannes Film Festival, numerous other prizes, and is a UNICEF National Ambassador for Serbia. Several Americans of Serb origin have been featured prominently in Hollywood. The most notable of these are Academy Award winners Karl Malden, Steve Tesich, Peter Bogdanovich, Tony-winning theatre director Darko Tresnjak, Emmy-winning director Marina Zenovich and actors Iván Petrovich, Brad Dexter, Lolita Davidovich, Milla Jovovich and Stana Katic.

Literature

Most literature written by early Serbs was about religious themes. The founders of the Serbian Orthodox Church wrote various gospels, psalters, menologies, hagiographies, along with essays and sermons. At the end of the 12th century, two of the most important pieces of Serbian medieval literature were created– the Miroslav Gospels and the Vukan Gospels, which combined handwritten Biblical texts with painted initials and small pictures. The Crnojević printing house was the first printing house in Southeastern Europe and is considered an important part of Serbian cultural history.

Notable Baroque-influenced authors were Andrija Zmajević, Gavril Stefanović Venclović, Jovan Rajić, Zaharije Orfelin and others. Dositej Obradović was the most prominent figure of the Age of Enlightenment, while the most notable Classicist writer was Jovan Sterija Popović, although his works also contained elements of Romanticism. Modern Serbian literature began with Vuk Karadžić's collections of folk songs in the 19th century, and the writings of Njegoš and Branko Radičević. The first prominent representative of Serbian literature in the 20th century was Jovan Skerlić, who wrote in pre–World War I Belgrade and helped introduce Serbian writers to literary modernism. The most important Serbian writer in the inter-war period was Miloš Crnjanski.

The first Serb authors who appeared after World War II were Mihailo Lalić and Dobrica Ćosić. Other notable post-war Yugoslav authors such as Ivo Andrić and Meša Selimović were assimilated to Serbian culture, and both identified as Serbs. Andrić went on to win the Nobel Prize in Literature in 1961. Danilo Kiš, another popular Serbian writer, was known for writing A Tomb for Boris Davidovich, as well as several acclaimed novels. Amongst contemporary Serbian writers, Milorad Pavić stands out as being the most critically acclaimed, with his novels Dictionary of the Khazars, Landscape Painted with Tea and The Inner Side of the Wind bringing him international recognition. Highly revered in Europe and in South America, Pavić is considered one of the most intriguing writers from the beginning of the 21st century. Charles Simic is a notable contemporary Serbian-American poet, former United States Poet Laureate and a Pulitzer Prize winner. Contemporary writer Zoran Živković authored more than 20 prose books and is best-known for his SF works which have been published in 23 countries.

Education and science

Many Serbs have contributed to the field of science and technology. There are more Serbian scientists and scholars working abroad than in the Balkans. At least 7000 Serbs who have a PhD are working abroad.

Serbian American scientist, inventor, physicist, mechanical engineer and electrical engineer Nikola Tesla is regarded as one of the most important inventors in history. He is renowned for his contributions to the discipline of electricity and magnetism in the late 19th and early 20th century. Seven Serbian American engineers and scientists known as Serbo 7 took part in construction of the Apollo spaceship. Physicist and physical chemist Mihajlo Pupin is best known for his landmark theory of modern electrical filters as well as for his numerous patents, while Milutin Milanković is best known for his theory of long-term climate change caused by changes in the position of the Earth in comparison to the Sun, now known as Milankovitch cycles. Gordana Vunjak-Novakovic is a Serbian American biomedical engineer focusing on engineering human tissues for regenerative medicine, stem cell research and modeling of disease. She is one of the most highly cited scientists of all times.

Notable Serb mathematicians include Mihailo Petrović, Jovan Karamata and Đuro Kurepa. Mihailo Petrović is known for having contributed significantly to differential equations and phenomenology, as well as inventing one of the first prototypes of an analog computer. Roger Joseph Boscovich was a Ragusan physicist, astronomer, mathematician and polymath of paternal Serbian origin (although there are competing claims for Bošković's nationality) who produced a precursor of atomic theory and made many contributions to astronomy and also discovered the absence of atmosphere on the Moon. Jovan Cvijić founded modern geography in Serbia and made pioneering research on the geography of the Balkan Peninsula, Dinaric race and karst. Josif Pančić made contributions to botany and discovered a number of new floral species including the Serbian spruce. Biologist and physiologist Ivan Đaja performed research in the role of the adrenal glands in thermoregulation, as well as pioneering work in hypothermia.
Valtazar Bogišić is considered to be a pioneer in the sociology of law and sociological jurisprudence.

Names
 

There are several different layers of Serbian names. Serbian given names largely originate from Slavic roots:
e.g., Vuk, Bojan, Goran, Zoran, Dragan, Milan, Miroslav, Vladimir, Slobodan, Dušan, Milica, Nevena, Vesna, Radmila. Other names are of Christian origin, originating from the bible (Hebrew, through Greek), such as Lazar, Mihailo, Ivan, Jovan, Ilija, Marija, Ana, Ivana. Along similar lines of non-Slavic Christian names are Greek ones such as: Stefan, Nikola, Aleksandar, Filip, Đorđe, Andrej, Jelena, Katarina, Vasilije, Todor, while those of Latin origin include: Marko, Antonije, Srđan, Marina, Petar, Pavle, Natalija, Igor (through Russian).

Most Serbian surnames are paternal, maternal, occupational or derived from personal traits. It is estimated that over two thirds of all Serbian surnames have the suffix -ić (-ић), a Slavic diminutive, originally functioning to create patronymics. Thus the surname Petrović means the "son of Petar" (from a male progenitor, the root is extended with possessive -ov or -ev). Due to limited use of international typewriters and unicode computer encoding, the suffix may be simplified to -ic, historically transcribed with a phonetic ending, -ich or -itch in foreign languages. Other common surname suffixes found among Serbian surnames are -ov, -ev, -in and -ski (without -ić) which is the Slavic possessive case suffix, thus Nikola's son becomes Nikolin, Petar's son Petrov, and Jovan's son Jovanov.  Other, less common suffices are -alj/olj/elj, -ija, -ica, -ar/ac/an. The ten most common surnames in Serbia, in order, are Jovanović, Petrović, Nikolić, Marković, Đorđević, Stojanović, Ilić, Stanković, Pavlović and Milošević.

Religion

Serbs are predominantly Orthodox Christians. The autocephaly of the Serbian Orthodox Church, was established in 1219, as an Archbishopric, and raised to the Patriarchate in 1346. It is led by the Serbian Patriarch, and consists of three archbishoprics, six metropolitanates and thirty-one eparchies, having around 10 million adherents. Followers of the church form the largest religious group in Serbia and Montenegro, and the second-largest in Bosnia and Herzegovina and Croatia. The church has an archbishopric in North Macedonia and dioceses in Western Europe, North America, South America and Australia.

The identity of ethnic Serbs was historically largely based on Orthodox Christianity and on the Serbian Church in particular. The conversion of the South Slavs from paganism to Christianity took place before the Great Schism. During the time of the Great Schism, Serbian rulers including Mihailo Vojislavljević and Stefan Nemanja were Catholics, with the former being a vassal of the Papal States. In 1217, the Serbian ruler Stefan Nemanja II was crowned by Pope Honorius III of the Catholic Church. However in 1219, Nemanja II was crowned once again by the newly independent Serbian Orthodox Church. This shift solidified the Christian Orthodox religion in Serbia.

With the arrival of the Ottoman Empire, some Serbs converted to Islam. This was particularly, but not wholly, the case in Bosnia. Since the second half of the 19th century, a small number of Serbs converted to Protestantism, while historically some Serbs were Catholics (especially in Bay of Kotor and Dalmatia; e.g. Serb-Catholic movement in Dubrovnik). In a personal correspondence with author and critic dr. Milan Šević in 1932, Marko Murat complained that Orthodox Serbs are not acknowledging the Catholic Serb community on the basis of their faith. The remainder of Serbs remain predominantly Serbian Orthodox Christians.

Symbols

Among the most notable national and ethnic symbols are the flag of Serbia and the coat of arms of Serbia. The flag consists of a red-blue-white tricolour, rooted in Pan-Slavism, and has been used since the 19th century. Apart from being the national flag, it is also used officially in Republika Srpska (by Bosnian Serbs) and as the official ethnic Flag of Serbs of Croatia. The coat of arms, which includes both the Serbian eagle and Serbian cross, has also been officially used since the 19th century, its elements dating back to the Middle Ages, showing Byzantine and Christian heritage. These symbols are used by various Serb organisations, political parties and institutions. The Three-finger salute, also called the "Serb salute", is a popular expression for ethnic Serbs and Serbia, originally expressing Serbian Orthodoxy and today simply being a symbol for ethnic Serbs and the Serbian nation, made by extending the thumb, index, and middle fingers of one or both hands.

Traditions and customs

Traditional clothing varies due to diverse geography and climate of the territory inhabited by the Serbs. The traditional footwear, opanci, is worn throughout the Balkans. The most common folk costume of Serbia is that of Šumadija, a region in central Serbia, which includes the national hat, the Šajkača. Older villagers still wear their traditional costumes. The traditional dance is the circle dance, called kolo. Zmijanje embroidery is a specific technique of embroidery practised by the women of villages in area Zmijanje on mountain Manjača and as such is a part of the UNESCO Representative List of the Intangible Cultural Heritage of Humanity. Pirot carpet is a variety of flat tapestry woven rug traditionally produced in Pirot, a town in southeastern Serbia.

Slava is the family's annual ceremony and veneration of their patron saint, a social event in which the family is together at the house of the patriarch. The tradition is an important ethnic marker of Serb identity. Serbs usually regard the Slava as their most significant and most solemn feast day.
Serbs have their own customs regarding Christmas, which includes the sacral tree, the badnjak, a young oak. On Orthodox Easter, Serbs have the tradition of Slavic Egg decorating. Čuvari Hristovog groba is a religious/cultural practice of guarding a representation of Christ's grave on Good Friday in the Church of St. Nicholas by the Serbian Orthodox inhabitants in the town of Vrlika.

Cuisine

Serbian cuisine is largely heterogeneous, with heavy Oriental, Central European and Mediterranean influences. Despite this, it has evolved and achieved its own culinary identity. Food is very important in Serbian social life, particularly during religious holidays such as Christmas, Easter and feast days, i.e., slava. Staples of the Serbian diet include bread, meat, fruits, vegetables, and dairy products. Traditionally, three meals are consumed per day. Breakfast generally consists of eggs, meat and bread. Lunch is considered the main meal, and is normally eaten in the afternoon. Traditionally, Domestic or turkish coffee is prepared after a meal, and is served in small cups. Bread is the basis of all Serbian meals, and it plays an important role in Serbian cuisine and can be found in religious rituals. A traditional Serbian welcome is to offer bread and salt to guests, and also slatko (fruit preserve). Meat is widely consumed, as is fish. Serbian specialties include kajmak (a dairy product similar to clotted cream), proja (cornbread), kačamak (corn-flour porridge), and gibanica (cheese and kajmak pie). Ćevapčići, caseless grilled and seasoned sausages made of minced meat, is the national dish of Serbia.

Šljivovica (Slivovitz) is the national drink of Serbia in domestic production for centuries, and plum is the national fruit. The international name Slivovitz is derived from Serbian. Plum and its products are of great importance to Serbs and part of numerous customs. A Serbian meal usually starts or ends with plum products and Šljivovica is served as an aperitif. A saying goes that the best place to build a house is where a plum tree grows best.  Traditionally, Šljivovica (commonly referred to as "rakija") is connected to Serbian culture as a drink used at all important rites of passage (birth, baptism, military service, marriage, death, etc.), and in the Serbian Orthodox patron saint celebration (slava). It is used in numerous folk remedies, and is given certain degree of respect above all other alcoholic drinks. The fertile region of Šumadija in central Serbia is particularly known for its plums and Šljivovica. Serbia is the largest exporter of Slivovitz in the world, and second largest plum producer in the world. Winemaking tradition in modern-day Serbia dates back to the Roman times in the 3rd century, while Serbs have been involved in winemaking since the 8th century.

Sport

Serbs are known for their sporting achievements, and have produced a number of talented athletes.

The Hungarian citizen Momčilo Tapavica was the first Slav and Serb to win an Olympic medal, in the 1896 Summer Olympics.

Over the years Serbia has been home to many internationally successful football players such as Dragan Džajić (officially recognized as "the best Serbian footballer of all times" by Football Association of Serbia; 1968 Ballon d'Or third place), Rajko Mitić, Dragoslav Šekularac and more recent likes of Dragan Stojković, Dejan Stanković, Nemanja Vidić (two-time Premier League Player of the Season and member of FIFPro World XI), Branislav Ivanović (Serbia's most capped player) and Nemanja Matić. Radomir Antić is a notable football coach, best known for his work with the national team, Real Madrid C.F. and FC Barcelona. Serbia has developed a reputation as one of the world's biggest exporters of expat footballers.
 
A total of 22 Serbian players have played in the NBA in the last two decades, including three-time NBA All-Star Predrag "Peja" Stojaković, NBA All-Star and both FIBA and NBA Hall of Fame inductee Vlade Divac, and the 2020–21–2022 NBA Most Valuable Player Award winner Nikola Jokić. Serbian players that made a great impact in Europe include four members of the FIBA Hall of Fame from the 1960s and 1970s – Dragan Kićanović, Dražen Dalipagić, Radivoj Korać, and Zoran Slavnić – as well as recent stars such as Dejan Bodiroga (2002 All-Europe Player of the Year), Aleksandar Đorđević (1994 and 1995 Mr. Europa), Miloš Teodosić (2009–10 Euroleague MVP), Nemanja Bjelica (2014–15 Euroleague MVP), and Vasilije Micić (2020–21 Euroleague MVP). The "Serbian coaching school" produced many of the most successful European coaches of all times, such as Željko Obradović (a record nine Euroleague titles), Božidar Maljković (four Euroleague titles), Aleksandar Nikolić (three Euroleague titles), Dušan Ivković (two Euroleague titles), and Svetislav Pešić (one Euroleague title).

The most notable Serbian tennis player is Novak Djokovic. He is a twenty-one-time major champion, a four-time Laureus Sportsman of the Year, and has been year-end World No. 1 on a record seven occasions.
Ana Ivanovic (champion of 2008 French Open) and Jelena Janković were both ranked No. 1 in the WTA rankings, while Nenad Zimonjić and Slobodan Živojinović were ranked No. 1 in doubles.

Notable water polo players are Vladimir Vujasinović, Aleksandar Šapić, Vanja Udovičić, Andrija Prlainović and Filip Filipović.

Other noted Serbian athletes, including Olympic and world champions and medalists, are: swimmer Milorad Čavić, volleyball player Nikola Grbić, handball player Svetlana Kitić, long-jumper Ivana Španović, shooter Jasna Šekarić, sprint canoer Marko Tomićević, judoka Nemanja Majdov and taekwondoist Milica Mandić.

A number of sportspeople of Serb origin represented other nations, such as tennis players Daniel Nestor, Jelena Dokic, Milos Raonic and Kristina Mladenovic, NHL player Milan Lucic, NBA All-star Pete Maravich, wrestler Jim Trifunov, sprint canoer Natasa Dusev-Janics, soccer player Miodrag Belodedici, artistic gymnast Lavinia Miloșovici, racquetball player Rhonda Rajsich and racing driver Bill Vukovich.

Historiography

See also

 List of Serbs

Notes

References

Sources

Primary sources

Secondary sources

External links

 Byzantine Illiricum - The Slavs Settlement (History of Balkan, part 1, Official chanel)
 Byzantine Dalmatian – The Arrival of Serbs (History of Balkan, part 1, Official chanel)
 Project Rastko – Serbian cultural and historical research society 

 
Ethnic groups in Bosnia and Herzegovina
Ethnic groups in Croatia
Ethnic groups in Hungary
Ethnic groups in Montenegro
Ethnic groups in Romania
 
Ethnic groups in Slovenia
Ethnic groups in North Macedonia
 
Society of Serbia
Slavic ethnic groups
South Slavs
Ethnoreligious groups in Europe
Ethnic groups in the Balkans